Dorian Alan Peña (born October 12, 1977) is a Filipino-American professional basketball player. He is nicknamed the "Junkyard Dawg" for his consistent plays of putbacks and offensive rebounds. He previously played for the Negros Slashers and the Pasig-Rizal Pirates in the defunct Metropolitan Basketball Association before being recruited by the Beermen.

A Mythical Five member in the 2004–05 season, the 6-6 slotman was relegated to the Second Team the following year. He was one of the only three locals to average in double-double during a season, the other two being Eric Menk and Asi Taulava, both former Most Valuable Player winners. Peña averaged a career-best 13.2 points and 11.5 boards per game in the 2005–06 season and has been consistent since then.

After spending twelve seasons with the Beermen, he was traded to the Barako Bull Energy along with Dondon Hontiveros, Paul Artadi and Danny Seigle for Nonoy Baclao, Rey Guevarra and Rabeh Al-Hussaini. He spent a season with the Energy providing boost off the bench after being traded again back to his former team. Pena went back to Barako again after another trade and was waived eventually after one season. After testing the free agency, Pena signed a deal with the GlobalPort Batang Pier. He was waived before the start of the 2016-17 PBA season.

PBA career statistics

Correct as of July 12, 2015

Season-by-season averages

|-
| align="left" | 2001
| align="left" | San Miguel
| 55 || 19.8 || .489 || .000 || .421 || 5.9 || .3 || .3 || .2 || 3.8
|-
| align="left" | 2002
| align="left" | San Miguel
| 49 || 29.3 || .566 || .000 || .651 || 9.0 || .7 || .3 || .5 || 10.9
|-
| align="left" | 2003
| align="left" | San Miguel
| 32 || 34.9 || .493 || .000 || .595 || 12.5 || 1.2 || .2 || .5 || 12.2
|-
| align="left" | 2004-05
| align="left" | San Miguel
| 70 || 27.6 || .472 || .000 || .524 || 8.6 || 1.2 || .2 || .2 || 9.2
|-
| align="left" | 2005-06
| align="left" | San Miguel
| 42 || 31.1 || .541 || .000 || .528 || 11.5 || .8 || .4 || .2 || 13.2
|-
| align="left" | 2006-07
| align="left" | San Miguel
| 62 || 24.9 || .552 || .000 || .525 || 8.6 || .7 || .3 || .2 || 9.5
|-
| align="left" | 2007-08
| align="left" | San Miguel
| 35 || 20.5 || .455 || .000 || .426 || 6.4 || .8 || .3 || .3 || 5.9
|-
| align="left" | 2008-09
| align="left" | San Miguel
| 49 || 21.3 || .460 || .000 || .552 || 7.1 || .6 || .4 || .5 || 8.1
|-
| align="left" | 2009-10
| align="left" | San Miguel
| 52 || 15.3 || .505 || .000 || .441 || 5.6 || .4 || .2 || .2 || 4.4
|-
| align="left" | 2010-11
| align="left" | San Miguel/Air 21
| 40 || 20.6 || .518 || .000 || .338 || 8.3 || .6 || .1 || .3 || 4.3
|-
| align="left" | 2011-12
| align="left" | Barako Bull/Petron Blaze
| 46 || 17.2 || .443 || .000 || .548 || 6.4 || .4 || .2 || .4 || 4.3
|-
| align="left" | 2012-13
| align="left" | Petron Blaze
| 32 || 14.1 || .407 || .000 || .600 || 4.6 || .2 || .3 || .2 || 1.9
|-
| align="left" | 2013-14
| align="left" | Barako Bull
| 24 || 20.5 || .475 || .000 || .452 || 6.0 || .26 || .2 || .2 || 5.1
|-
| align="left" | 2014-15
| align="left" | Barako Bull/Ginebra
| 20 || 11.2 || .111 || .000 || .429 || 2.2 || .3 || .1 || .1 || .2
|-
| align="left" | Career
| align="left" |
| 608 || 22.6 || .502 || .000 || .524 || 7.6 || 0.7 || .3 || .3 || 7.1

Criminal charges
Pena was arrested on drug charges on May 11, 2017 in a buy-bust operation held in Mandaluyong, Philippines.

Awards
 2005-06 PBA Mythical Second Team
 2005-06 PBA All-Defensive Team
 2004-05 PBA Mythical First Team

References

1977 births
Living people
Barako Bull Energy players
Barangay Ginebra San Miguel players
Basketball players from Maryland
Centers (basketball)
Coppin State Eagles men's basketball players
Filipino men's basketball players
NorthPort Batang Pier players
People from Cheverly, Maryland
Philippine Basketball Association All-Stars
San Miguel Beermen players
American men's basketball players
Doping cases in basketball
American sportspeople of Filipino descent
Citizens of the Philippines through descent